Pierre Wolff (1 January 1865, in Paris – 1944) was a French playwright.

Biography

Pierre Wolff was a Jewish writer, who wrote numerous plays, as well as some libretti for operettas. He was the nephew of journalist Albert Wolff. His dramas were characterized by bitingly ironic observation of contemporary life, and by witty dialogue. One of his earliest plays, Jacques Bouchard (1890) which was performed at Théâtre Libre, was such a flop that even his famous uncle lambasted it, but his subsequent plays were received with enthusiasm. He had great success with the adultery-themed comedy The Secret of Polichinelle, which played in over 80 cities including in the United States, and also with Le Ruisseau. Nazimova performed in Les Marionnettes when it was produced in the United States.

Works

Plays

 Le Cheval d'Aristote 1890
 Jacques Bouchard, 1890
 Leurs filles, 1891
 Les Maris de leurs filles 1892
 Celles qu'on respecte, 1892
 Celles qu'on aime, 1895
 Fidèle!, 1895 
 Amants et maîtresses 1896
 Le Boulet, 1898
 Le Béguin, 1900
 Vive l'armée!, 1901
 Sacré Léonce!, 1901
 Le Cadre, 1902
Celles qu'on respecte 1903
 The Secret of Polichinelle, 1903
 L'Âge d'aimer 1905
 Le Ruisseau, 1907
 Le Lys,  1908
 La Cruche, or J'en ai plein le dos de Margot 1909
 Les Marionnettes 1910
 L'Amour défendu 1911
 Les Deux Gloires 1916
 Le Voile déchiré 1919
 Les Ailes brisées 1920
 Le Chemin de Damas 1921
 Une sacré petite blonde  with André Birabeau 1921
 Les Deux amants 1922
 L'École des amants 1923
 After Love, with Henri Duvernois 1924
 Le Renard, 1925
 Deux hommes, 1 act, 1926
 Dibengo, with Henri Duvernois 1925
 Le Dernier Client, 1 act, 1928
 Dix minutes sur la terre, rewrite 1929
 L'Invité, 1 act 1929
 La Belle de nuit 1932
 Les Deux vieilles, 1 act, 1932
 L'Inroulable, 1 act

Librettist
 Le Temps d'aimer, operetta in 3 actes, with Henri Duvernois, lyrics Hugues Delorme, music Reynaldo Hahn 1926
 Moineau, operetta in 3 actes, with Henri Duvernois, lyrics Léon Guillot de Saix, music Louis Beydts, 1931

Filmography 
, directed by Émile Chautard (1918, based on the play Les Marionnettes)
The Virtuous Model, directed by Albert Capellani (1919, based on the play Le Ruisseau)
The Secret of Polichinelle, directed by René Hervil (1923, based on the play The Secret of Polichinelle)
After Love, directed by Maurice Champreux (1924, based on the play After Love)
The Lily, directed by Victor Schertzinger (1926, based on the play Le Lys)
, directed by René Hervil (1929, based on the play Le Ruisseau)
When Love Is Over, directed by Léonce Perret (1931, based on the play After Love)
, directed by André Berthomieu (1933, based on the play Les Ailes brisées)
, directed by Christian-Jaque (1936, based on the play Sacré Léonce)
The Secret of Polichinelle, directed by André Berthomieu (1936, based on the play The Secret of Polichinelle)
, directed by Gustaf Molander (Sweden, 1936, based on the play The Secret of Polichinelle)
, directed by Maurice Lehmann (1938, based on the play Le Ruisseau)
After Love, directed by Maurice Tourneur (1948, based on the play After Love)

Screenwriter
La route est belle (The Road Is Fine), directed by Robert Florey (1930)
Un carnet de bal (Life Dances On), directed by Julien Duvivier (1937)
Abus de confiance (Abused Confidence), directed by Henri Decoin (1938)
Retour à l'aube (Return at Dawn), directed by Henri Decoin (1938)
Serenade, directed by Jean Boyer (1940)
The Man Who Seeks the Truth, directed by Alexander Esway (1940)
Bring On the Girls, directed by Sidney Lanfield (1945) - Loosely based on The Man Who Seeks the Truth
Abuso de confianza, directed by Mario C. Lugones (Argentina, 1950) - Remake of Abused Confidence

References

External links

Review of L'Age d'aimer, "The Sea-Coast of Bohemia" (June 10, 1905) The Outlook, Vol. 15, p. 830

20th-century French dramatists and playwrights
Writers from Paris
1944 deaths
1865 births